"Never Give Up (Party Party)" is the fifth solo single by Scottish musician Paul Haig. It was released in the UK on Island Records and licensed through Les Disques du Crépuscule.

The track, along with its parent studio album Rhythm of Life (1983), was recorded in New York with producer Alex Sadkin. A wide range of guest musicians appeared on the album; Tom Bailey of Thompson Twins, Bernie Worrell of Funkadelic and Anton Fier of the Feelies.

In mainland Europe, the single and album were released on Les Disques du Crépuscule.

Track listing
"Never Give Up (Party Party)"
"Heartache" (Party Mix)

References

External links
 

1983 singles
Paul Haig songs
1983 songs
Songs written by Paul Haig
Island Records singles
Song recordings produced by Alex Sadkin